Karl Striebinger (2 August 1913 – 12 June 1981) was a German footballer and manager who played as a forward and made three appearances for the Germany national team.

Career
Striebinger made his international debut for Germany on 21 March 1937 in a friendly against Luxembourg. He scored the second and third goals for Germany in the match, which took place in Luxembourg City and finished as a 3–2 win. He earned his third and final cap on 6 February 1938 in a friendly against Switzerland, which finished as a 1–1 draw in Cologne.

Personal life
Striebinger died on 12 June 1981 at the age of 67.

Career statistics

International

International goals

References

External links
 
 
 
 
 

1913 births
1981 deaths
People from Rhein-Pfalz-Kreis
Footballers from Rhineland-Palatinate
German footballers
Germany international footballers
Association football forwards
VfR Mannheim players
German football managers
Karlsruher FV managers
BC Augsburg managers
Wormatia Worms managers
FV Speyer managers
FC 08 Homburg managers
SV Waldhof Mannheim managers
1. FC Pforzheim managers